The American Shore and Beach Preservation Association (ASBPA) is a private, nonprofit organization formed in 1926. It was founded to address coastal erosion and the loss of sand on America's beaches. Today, ASBPA is an association of beach and coastal practitioners, including beach towns and managers, coastal engineers, coastal geologists, dredging and ecological restoration companies, coastal academics and students. ASBPA advances coastal science and coastal engineering through its peer-reviewed journal, Shore & Beach, and an annual technical conference. It also hosts an annual coastal summit in Washington, DC to advocate for coastal policies.

History 
ASBPA was founded in 1926, and was initially instrumental in persuading the Congress to enact legislation authorizing federal funding of erosion studies and project works for shore protection. In 1930, ASBPA helped form the Beach Erosion Board.  ASBPA was politically engaged on coastal erosion and beach nourishment for most of the 20th century and has had number of prominent coastal advocates and members of the Army Corps of Engineers on its board, including Morrough Parker O'Brien, who served as President from 1972-1983.

After a long partnership, ASBPA merged with the American Coastal Coalition (ACC) in 2003. In 2015, ASBPA formed memorandum of understanding with the Coastal Zone Foundation (CZF) to collaborate on a certification program for coastal practitioners.

Advocacy 
ASBPA (and the ACC, which it merged with in 2003) has been the leading advocate for the United States Army Corps of Engineers shore protection program which builds and provides federal funding for beach and dunes systems as coastal flood protection for vulnerable communities. The focus on sand and sediment has led the organization to advocate for the beneficial use of dredged material and natural coastal infrastructure. In February 2017, ASBPA President Anthony P. Pratt was invited to testify before United States Senate Committee on Environment and Public Works on the value of beaches, dunes, wetlands and other natural coastal infrastructure to the nation. In 2019, ASBPA Executive Director, Derek Brockbank, testified before the United States House Committee on Transportation and Infrastructure and the Senate Environment and Public Works Committee, on issues related to beach and coastal restoration in the Water Resources Development Act

Publications 

Shore & Beach is a peer-reviewed journal, published by ASBPA four times per year. It includes scientific articles and general interest features. Typically, one issue per year is a special issue devoted to single subject. Shore & Beach has been published since 1933.

"Coastal Voice" is a member newsletter distributed by ASBPA eleven times per year. It includes coastal policy updates, science and technology updates, information on conferences and workshops, and changes to the board and staff of ASBPA.

Best Restored Beach and Shore 

ASBPA presents annual awards for Best Restored Beach to communities that have recently undergone nourishment or full restoration. And starting in 2019, ASBPA presents awards for Best Restored Shore to non-beach shorelines.

Inaugural 2019 Best Restored Shore winners were:
 Virginia Point Wetland Protection Project, Texas
 Mississippi River Long Distance Sediment Pipeline, Louisiana
 Money Point Shoreline Restoration, Virginia
 Mispillion Living Shoreline Project, Delaware

Recent Best Restored Beach winners have included:

2019 Winners
 Caminada Headland, Louisiana
 South Padre Island, Texas
 Waypoint Park Beach, Bellingham, WA
 Duval County, Florida

2018 Winners
 Dare County, North Carolina Beaches, NC
 Galveston Seawall Beach, TX
 Cardiff Beach, Encinitas, CA
 Sagaponack-Bridgehampton Beaches, NY
 Thompsons Beach, NJ

2017 Winners
 Dauphin Island, AL
 Phipps Ocean Park, Palm Beach, FL
 Popponesset Spit, MA
 Prime Hook Beach, DE
 Sandbridge Beach, Virginia Beach, VA

2016 winners:
 Babe’s Beach, Galveston, TX
 Rosewood Beach, Highland Park, IL
 Seabrook Island, SC
 Topsail Beach, NC
 Redondo Beach, CA.
2015 winners:
Galveston Island, TX
Santa Monica, CA
Western Destin Beach, FL
Folly Beach, SC
South Hutchinson Island/St Lucie, FL

Chapters 
California Shore & Beach Preservation Association - www.csbpa.org
Central-East Coast chapter of ASBPA
Central Gulf Coast chapter of ASBPA
Hawaii Shore & Beach Preservation Association - www.hawaiishoreandbeach.org
Great Lakes Shore & Beach Preservation Association
Northeast Shore & Beach Preservation Association - www.nsbpa.org
Student Chapter of ASBPA at Stevens Institute of Technology - http://gradlife.stevens.edu/org/stevensasbpa
Texas chapter of ASBPA - www.texasasbpa.org

External links
ASBPA Web Site

References

Environmental organizations based in the United States
Coastal engineering